The Visconti Castle of Binasco is a mediaeval castle located in Binasco, Metropolitan City of Milan, Lombardy, Northern Italy. It is famous for having been the prison and execution place of Beatrice di Tenda (Duchess of Milan and wife of Filippo Maria Visconti), arrested and there sentenced to death for adultery in 1418. Today it is the seat of the Municipality of Binasco.

History
Luchino Visconti, Lord of Milan, built the castle, probably between 1315 and 1319 when the nearby church of Saint Stephan was erected. Its first mention dates back to 1329, when Azzone Visconti and his uncle Giovanni used it as a prison for their political opponents.

The building followed the Visconti castle model of the Lombard plains: a quadrangular layout with a central courtyard, towers at the corners, and the surrounding moat. The walls were made entirely in exposed brick.

In the 17th century the castle underwent transformations and restorations. At the end of the 19th century, it was sacked during the Napoleonic age, and in 1869 a devastating fire struck it. The current building is the result of repeated restorations that preserved the appearance of the initial castle. Two towers are still visible along the south front.

Today

In good conditions, the castle belongs partly to the Municipality of Binasco and partly to the Province of Milan. It hosts public offices of the town council, the public library, and the Carabinieri station.

References

Sources

External links
 Lombardia Beni Culturali – Castello Visconteo, Binasco (MI)
 Castelli i torri d'Italia – Castello di Binasco

Castles in Lombardy